Jeże  is a village in the administrative district of Gmina Pisz, within Pisz County, Warmian-Masurian Voivodeship, in northern Poland.

The village has a population of 330.

Notable residents
 Paul Hensel (politician) (1867–1944), Lutheran Pastor and Politician

References

Villages in Pisz County